Begonia manicata is a species of flowering plant in the family Begoniaceae, native to Mexico and Central America. The cultivar 'Aureo-maculata' is called the leopard begonia.

References

manicata
Flora of Mexico
Flora of Guatemala
Flora of Honduras
Flora of Nicaragua
Plants described in 1842